DWTM (89.9 FM), on-air as Magic 89.9, is a radio station owned and operated by Quest Broadcasting Incorporated. It serves as the flagship station of Magic Nationwide and the flagship partner station of Tiger 22 Media. The station's studios and transmitter are located at Unit 907, 9th floor, Paragon Plaza, EDSA cor. Reliance St., Mandaluyong. This station operates daily from 6:00 AM to 12:00 AM on terrestrial radio and 24/7 online.

History

1980s: Early programming and "The Battle of the Radios" trend
The station began its regular operations on February 14, 1986, under the ownership of the CDC Radio Network, Inc., and  broadcasting from the now-demolished Philippine Communications Center building (PHILCOMCEN) in Pasig, starting with a 10 on-air crew led by Bernie Buenaseda, known on-air as "Burning Bernie". It became a witness to history unfolding before the Filipinos as the station was also started 11 days before the late Corazon "Cory" Aquino became president and 7 months exactly before ABS-CBN was reopened. At that time, DWTM operated 21 hours a day, starting its broadcast day at 5 am until signing off the following morning at 2 am.

Between 1988 and 1989, the station started broadcasting 24 hours a day, which turned out to be a huge success. "The Battle of the Radios" during that era, was supported by a wide variety of spoofs and gimmicks not to mention sidekicks, (no computers, no hard drives; just a bunch of wires and switches,) which made broadcasting ultra-creative as compared to that done with the digital technology of today.

1990s: The emergence of Love Notes
Magic 89.9 became the first home of "Love Notes" that started in 1988, which was initially conceptualized as a gimmick. The 15 minute counseling program hosted by Joe D'Mango became an instant hit with office workers every Friday morning. Love Notes is also aired on ABC-5 from 1993 to 1998 and became an eponymous movie that produced by VIVA Films in 1995. It transferred to its sister station Wave 89.1 in 2001. The show returned on DZMM in 2011, but moved to Radyo Singko in 2012, and lasted until 2013.

On November 29, 1999, Magic 89.9 transferred its studios from PHILCOMCEN Building in Pasig to the Paragon Plaza Building in Mandaluyong to share facilities with sister stations 99.5 RT (now 99.5 Play FM) and 103.5 K-Lite, Mellow Touch 94.7 (now Mellow 947), DWBL 1242 and DWSS 1494.

2000s: Good Times and Boys Night Out popularity
Since its inception, the station started a trend on FM radio of making Fridays nostalgia days with the Friday Magic Madness program (now Friday Madness), that plays music from the 1980s hit music all day. On the other hand, weekend program Saturday Slam plays the 1990s music.

Mo Twister, after four years in hiatus, returned to Magic 89.9, with Good Times With Mo (Limited Edition). He returned again in February 2006 with Good Times With Mo, along with Mojo Jojo, then a late night show. In June 2006, it was transferred to the morning slot (6-9 AM) with a third co-host, Andi. She, however resigned in February 2007, and was replaced by Maui Taylor. Maui retired on May 30, 2007, so Andi9 returned in June 2007, only to leave again in November 2007. The third co-host was Noelle Bonus.

On July 17, 2007, The Magic website was in operation once more to serve the net surfing Magic 89.9 listeners here and especially abroad. Recent additions to the Magic list of programs include the American Top 40 (AT40) which is hosted by American Idol presenter and American radio and TV personality Ryan Seacrest, as well as BigFish Radio hosted by Johnboy Lee of BigFish Manila every Saturday nights which features exclusive programs by international club DJs such as Paul Van Dyk, David Guetta, Armin van Buuren and others.

2010s: The Magic's 30th Anniversary Celebration
In January 2014, Mo Twister returns on his morning show Good Times with his new co-host Sam Oh (from its previous timeslot First Thing in the Morning while Good Times was under a 5-month suspension) and Filipino-Canadian internet sensation Mikey Bustos.

On May 31, 2014, the station brought back its Saturday night club timeslot with the debut of Saturday Night Takeover mixed by the country's popular club DJs such as Ace Ramos, Mars Miranda, Marc Marasigan, Deuce Manila, Katsy Lee, Travis Monsod, Ron Poe among others.

After 27 year, Lovenotes returned on air last November 6, 2015. On December 26, 2015, Saturday Slam aired for the last time. Super Hit Sunday, consists of mornings with the Junior Jocks to afternoons with selected weekend/fill-in DJs, extended to Saturdays, becoming Super Hit Weekend.

On February 28, 2016, Magic celebrated its 30th anniversary with major changes in the programming. The station brought back its usual Sunday night slow jam program Sunday Slowdown, after a decade of being replaced by another re-titled program Slow Flow, and later, Nothing Noisy. It also shifted the timeframe of Friday Madness from the original 1980s to the current 1990s and 2000s. In November the same year, the station held its 30th anniversary concert featuring OPM icons Ely Buendia and Rico Blanco at Eastwood City.

In July 2017, Delamar Arias from Monster RX 93.1 joined the station, Andi Manzano also returned and co-host the weekly family-oriented program The Mother Show along with Rikiflo.

On August 5, 2022, the station revived Retro in the Metro, this time as a segment of Friday Madness, featuring music from the 1980s in the morning (7 to 8am) and afternoon (4 to 5pm).

Magic 89.9 CD compilations
Magic Urban Flow (MCA Music Philippines, 2005)
Party on Weekends (EMI Music Philippines, 2005)
Club Myx (EMI Music Philippines, 2006)
Kami nAPO Muna (Universal Records, 2006)
Party On Weekends (House Edition) (EMI Music Philippines, 2006)
The Best Of Manila Sound: Hopia Mani Popcorn (Viva Records, 2006)
Friday Madness OPM Edition/Retro In The Metro (Vicor Music, 2007)
Kami nAPO Muna Ulit (Universal Records, 2007)
Remember The OPM In The 80s (Vicor Music, 2007)
The Best Of Manila Sound 2: Hopia Mani Popcorn (Viva Records, 2007)
The Nicest Of The 90s (Viva Records, 2007)
Friday Madness (MCA Music Philippines, 2009)

References

External links
 

Contemporary hit radio stations in the Philippines
OPM formatted radio stations in the Philippines
Radio stations in Metro Manila
Quest Broadcasting
Radio stations established in 1986
1986 establishments in the Philippines
Tiger 22 Media Corporation